UrbanBaby was a New York-based Internet forum devoted to anonymous discussion of urban motherhood founded in August 1999 by Susan and John Maloney. It shut down on July 6, 2020.

The site  gained attention by many parents across major cities but mostly in New York.

The site was later bought by CNET.

The site had employed David Karp as a software consultant before he went on to found Tumblr using his earnings from (and experience gained during) his time at UrbanBaby. 

A similar site in Japan is the Yomiuri Shimbun's Hatsugen Komachi.

References

External links
 UrbanBaby.com website

Internet forums
Internet properties established in 1999
Defunct CBS Interactive websites
1999 establishments in New York City
Internet properties disestablished in 2020